Ilie is a Romanian name. It is both a masculine given name, cognate of Elijah, and a surname.

The given name may refer to:
 Ilie Antonescu, Romanian general
 Ilie Baicu, Romanian football player
 Ilie Balaci, Romanian football player
 Ilie Bărbulescu, Romanian football player
 Ilie Bărbulescu, Romanian linguist
 Ilie Birt, Transylvanian merchant
 Ilie Bratu, Moldovan politician
 Ilie Cazac, Moldovan political prisoner
 Ilie Cătărău, Romanian soldier
 Ilie Ceaușescu, Romanian politician
 Ilie Cebanu, Moldovan football player
 Ilie Codreanu, Romanian sport shooter
 Ilie Crețulescu, Romanian general
 Ilie Datcu, Romanian football player
 Ilie Dumitrescu, Romanian football player
 Ilie Enache, Romanian noble 
 Ilie Floroiu, Romanian runner
 Ilie Ilașcu, Romanian politician
 Ilie Iordache, Romanian football player
 Ilie Lazăr, Romanian politician
 Ilie Matei, Romanian wrestler
 Ilie Murgulescu, Romanian scientist and politician
 Ilie Năstase, Romanian tennis player
 Ilie Pintilie, Romanian political activist
 Ilie Popa, Romanian mathematician
 Ilie I, Prince of Moldavia
 Ilie II Rareș, Prince of Moldavia
 Ilie Sârbu, Romanian politician
 Ilie Savu, Romanian football player
 Ilie Sánchez, Spanish football player
 Ilie Șerbănescu, Romanian economist
 Ilie Stan, Romanian tennis player
 Ilie Șteflea, Romanian general
 Ilie Subășeanu, Romanian football player
 Ilie Tudor, Romanian fencer
 Ilie Văduva, Romanian politician
 Ilie Verdeț, Romanian politician

The surname may refer to:
 Adrian Ilie, Romanian football player
 Adrian Ilie (footballer born 1981), Romanian football player
 Andrew Ilie, Romanian Australian tennis player
 Cleopa Ilie, Romanian cleric
 Cristian Ilie, Romanian politician
 Florin Ilie, Romanian football player
 Giulian Ilie, Romanian boxer
 Lucian Ilie, Romanian football player
 Mihai Ilie, Romanian football player
 Mircea Ilie, Romanian football player
 Sabin Ilie, Romanian football player
 Silviu Ilie, Romanian football player

See also 
 Ilieși (disambiguation)

Romanian-language surnames
Romanian masculine given names